The 1914 Texas A&M Aggies football team was an American football team that represented the Agricultural and Mechanical College of Texas—now known as Texas A&M University—as a member of the Southern Intercollegiate Athletic Association (SIAA) during the 1914 college football season. In their sixth and final year under head coach Charley Moran, the Aggies compiled an overall record of 6–1–1 with a mark of 2–0 in SIAA play.

Schedule

References

Texas AandM
Texas A&M Aggies football seasons
Texas AandM